Die schönsten Melodien aus Derrick & Der Alte is a soundtrack compilation album released in 1979 by Frank Duval & Orchestra, celebrating two famous German TV series, Derrick and Der Alte.

Track listing
 "Todesengel" – 4:30
 "Me to You" – 3:08
 "Ballade pour Adeline" – 2:35
 "Sky Train" – 4:20
 "Mandala" – 5:21
 "Farewell" – 3:10
 "Love" – 3:50
 "Tyana" – 3:35
 "Sorry to Leave You" – 2:02
 "Tears" - 4:12
 "Kalinas Melodie" - 3:25

Personnel
 Martin Harrison - drums, percussion
 Günther Gebauer - bass guitar
 Billy Lang, Michael Goltz - guitar
 Mladen Franko - piano, Logan-strings: A.R.P.synthesizer
 Frank Duval - polymoog, minimoog
 Gudrun Haag - harp

Credits
 Produced and Arranged by Frank Duval
 Engineered by Peter Floß

Frank Duval albums
Albums produced by Frank Duval
1979 compilation albums
1979 soundtrack albums
Television soundtracks
Soundtrack compilation albums